William Mason  (January 24, 1829 – July 14, 1908) was an American composer and pianist and a member of a musical family. His father was composer Lowell Mason, a leading figure in American church music, and his younger brother, Henry Mason, was a co-founder of the piano manufacturers Mason & Hamlin.

Career
Mason was born in Boston. After a successful debut at the Boston Academy of Music, he went to Europe in 1849; there he was the first American piano student of Franz Liszt and Ignaz Moscheles. He became the leader of a chamber ensemble based in New York that introduced many works of Robert Schumann and other famous Europeans to Americans during the Civil War era and beyond, at a time when classical music still had little specifically American identity.

Mason published numerous pedagogical works for the piano student, but is remembered above all for his Chopinesque compositions for piano. The American composer and pianist Edward MacDowell (1860-1908) dedicated his second piano sonata, Op. 50 Sonata Eroica (1895), to William Mason. He died in New York City, aged 79.

References

Further reading

External links
 
 
 

1829 births
1908 deaths
19th-century classical composers
19th-century classical pianists
19th-century American composers
19th-century American pianists
19th-century American male musicians
20th-century classical composers
20th-century American composers
20th-century American male musicians
American Romantic composers
American male classical composers
American classical pianists
Male classical pianists
American male pianists